Leo Tyrrell (2 June 1915 – 12 April 1969) was an Australian rules footballer who played with North Melbourne and Collingwood in the Victorian Football League (VFL).

Notes

External links 

		
Profile on Collingwood Forever

1915 births
1969 deaths
Australian rules footballers from Victoria (Australia)
North Melbourne Football Club players
Collingwood Football Club players